Washington, D.C.'s Chinatown is a small, historic area east of Downtown Washington, D.C. along H and I Streets between 5th and 8th Streets, Northwest. The area was once home to thousands of Chinese immigrants, but fewer than 300 remained in 2017. The current neighborhood was the second in Washington to be called “Chinatown” since 1931. Originally, the first Chinatown was built in the Federal Triangle on the south side of Pennsylvania Avenue some time after 1851, but was moved to the H Street area when a new federal building was built there.  In 1986, a Chinese gate was built over H Street at 7th Street. By 1997, prominent landmarks such as the Capital One Arena, a sports and entertainment arena, had gentrified the area. The neighborhood is served by the Gallery Place station of the Washington Metro.

History 

The Chinatown area was once home to many Chinese immigrants, who began to move into the area in the 1930s, having been displaced from Washington's original Chinatown along Pennsylvania Avenue by the development of the Federal Triangle government office complex. The newcomers marked it with Chinese signage and decorative metal latticework and railings. At its peak, Chinatown extended from G Street north to Massachusetts Avenue, and from 9th Street east to 5th Street.

In 1982, the city built the Wah Luck House apartments at 6th and H Streets, NW, to accommodate the displaced residents in 1982. Designed by architect Alfred Liu, the apartment building introduced modern Chinese design motifs due to the red-paneled balconies.

In 1986, the city dedicated the Friendship Archway, a traditional Chinese gate. This was a collaboration between the Washington DC government and its sister city Beijing. It was intended to attract visitors in addition to recognizing the local Chinese residents. As part of the same effort, the Metro station was given its present name: Gallery Place-Chinatown. 

The MCI Center was completed in 1997 (renamed Verizon Center in 2006 and Capital One Arena in 2017). After the construction of the arena, AsianWeek said in 2000 that the neighborhood "barely" remains.

Numerous writers have cited Chinatown as an example of gentrification and an example of the commodification of culture. In 2015, the Washington Post reported that only about 300 Chinese-Americans remained in the borough, and many of them were being forced out by their landlords.

Demographics

In 2010, the census tract that contains Chinatown has around 3,000 residents. Chinatown is only 21% Asian, compared to 1990, when it had a majority Chinese American population. In 1990, its population was 66% Asian and 20% African American. Washington, D.C.'s Chinatown is relatively small in terms of size and number of Chinese residents in comparison to other major Chinatown neighborhoods in the U.S., such as those in San Francisco and in Manhattan. Approximately half of Chinatown's residents live in the Wah Luck House, which has 153 units of apartment complexes. The closest Chinese supermarket, the Great Wall Supermarket, is fourteen miles west in Falls Church, Virginia.

After the deadly 1968 riots following the April assassination of Martin Luther King Jr., many Chinese people sought a more economically stable and safe environment and moved out of Washington, D.C.'s Chinatown, relocating to suburban neighborhoods in Fairfax County, Virginia, and Montgomery County, Maryland.  In 1970, there were roughly 3,000 Chinese residents in Washington's Chinatown; by 2016, the number was fewer than 600, many of them seniors residing in two low-income housing developments. North Potomac, Maryland, is 18.4% Chinese American, the highest of any community within the Washington metropolitan area. The Maryland city of Rockville also has a significant population of residents of Chinese descent, at eight percent. In Virginia, sizable Chinese American communities are located in Centreville, Chantilly, and Floris, south of Washington Dulles International Airport.

Businesses and establishments

Along with the development of the Verizon Center, historic buildings, mainly along the west side of 7th Street, were renovated and tenanted, primarily with nationally known brand shops and dining establishments.  Within a short time, a significant mixed-use office-residential-retail development on the southeast corner of 7th and H streets commenced construction. These developments, which included restaurants, shops, a cinema complex, and a bowling alley, together with the Verizon Center, transformed the area into a bustling scene for nightlife, shopping, and entertainment. An anomaly is that most of the businesses are no longer representative of Chinatown, yet due to a city design guidelines encouraging businesses to use Chinese characters, even national chains such as Starbucks, Hooters, Ruby Tuesday, Ann Taylor, Urban Outfitters, Bed Bath and Beyond, and Legal Sea Foods hang their names in Chinese outside their stores. Chinatown has become home to many high-growth technology companies, such as Blackboard, Blue State Digital, LivingSocial, and The Knowland Group. It is also the location of the Washington branch of the Goethe-Institut.

Chinatown's most prominent businesses are the approximately 20 Chinese and Asian restaurants, almost all of which are owned by Asian American families. Among the most well-known are Chinatown Express, Eat First, Full Kee, and Tony Cheng's. One of the restaurants, Wok & Roll, occupies what was once Mary Surratt's boarding house — the meeting place for John Wilkes Booth and his conspirators in Abraham Lincoln's assassination. Another is located in a house once owned by the On Leong Chinese Merchants Association, which was among the first Chinese organizations to move into the neighborhood; today the structure is on the National Register of Historic Places.

The neighborhood is home to a Chinese video store, several general stores, and numerous Chinese American cultural and religious charities. Chinatown has one Chinese church, Chinese Community Church, located at 500 I Street. Chinese Community Church was founded in 1935, initially at L Street, but relocated in 2006 to its current I Street location. The 6th and I streets historic synagogue has been restored and is the scene of cultural events.

The Washington DC Chinatown Community Cultural Center offers numerous activities, classes and services.

Transportation
The Gallery Place Washington Metro station (on the Red, Green, and Yellow Lines), which opened in 1976, serves the neighborhood. The name of the station was changed to Gallery Place-Chinatown in 1986. Two important Metrobus routes cross at 7th and H Streets.

In culture
Within the FBI-commissioned film Game of Pawns the D.C. Chinatown is used as a stand-in for Shanghai.

See also
 Chinatown, Baltimore
 Rockville, Maryland
 Taiwanese Americans
 Chinese Americans

References

External links

 Washington's Chinese Mafia Wars

Asian-American culture in Washington, D.C.
Washington, D.C.
 
Ethnic enclaves in Washington, D.C.
Entertainment districts in the United States
Neighborhoods in Northwest (Washington, D.C.)
Restaurant districts and streets in the United States
1930s establishments in Washington, D.C.